Leander Independent School District is a school district based in Leander, Texas (USA) and covering a total of  in Leander, Cedar Park, Georgetown, Jonestown, Round Rock in Williamson County and northwest Austin in Travis County. In 2015, the school district was rated "Met Standards" by the Texas Education Agency.

The district has a "CollegeConnection" arrangement with Austin Community College.

Schools

High schools
 Cedar Park High School
 Tom Glenn High School
 Leander High School
 Rouse High School
 Vandegrift High School
 Vista Ridge High School

Middle schools
 Canyon Ridge Middle School
 Cedar Park Middle School
 Danielson Middle School
 Four Points Middle School
 Henry Middle School
 Leander Middle School (formerly Leander Junior High School)
 Running Brushy Middle School
 Stiles Middle School
 Wiley Middle School

Elementary schools

Akin Elementary School 
Bagdad Elementary School 
Block House Creek Elementary School
Christine Camacho Elementary School 
Cox Elementary School 
Cypress Elementary School 
Deer Creek Elementary School
Faubion Elementary School 
Giddens Elementary School 
Grandview Hills Elementary School 
Knowles Elementary School 
Larkspur Elementary School
Laura Welch Bush Elementary School 
Mason Elementary School 
Naumann Elementary School 
North Elementary School
Parkside Elementary School 
Jim Plain Elementary School 
Pleasant Hill Elementary School 
Reagan Elementary School 
Reed Elementary School 
River Place Elementary School 
River Ridge Elementary School 
Rutledge Elementary School 
Steiner Ranch Elementary School
Tarvin Elementary School 
Westside Elementary School 
Whitestone Elementary School 
Winkley Elementary School

Alternative schools
Early College High School
New Hope High School
Leander Extended Opportunity Center (LEO)

References

External links 
 Leander Independent School District
 List of schools

School districts in Williamson County, Texas
School districts in Travis County, Texas
Leander, Texas
Cedar Park, Texas
Education in Austin, Texas